The Richard Caples Building is a historic seven-story building in El Paso, Texas. It was built as a five-story for Richard Caples in 1910, and it was "the first reinforced concrete structure erected in El Paso." The fifth floor was leased to the Y.M.C.A. In 1915, the building was purchased by J.G. McGrady, who leased the basement and the first floor to F. W. Woolworth Company. Two years later, he built two more storys; they were designed by Trost & Trost. The building has been listed on the National Register of Historic Places since September 24, 1980.

References

Buildings and structures completed in 1910
Buildings and structures in El Paso, Texas
National Register of Historic Places in El Paso County, Texas
Romanesque Revival architecture in Texas
Trost & Trost buildings